Berlești is a commune in Gorj County, Oltenia, Romania. It is composed of seven villages: Bârzeiu, Berlești, Gâlcești, Lihulești, Pârâu Viu, Scrada and Scurtu.

References

Communes in Gorj County
Localities in Oltenia